Mohamed Ghaloum (born 9 December 1965) is a Kuwaiti fencer. He competed in the team foil event at the 1984 Summer Olympics.

References

External links
 

1965 births
Living people
Kuwaiti male foil fencers
Olympic fencers of Kuwait
Fencers at the 1984 Summer Olympics